Frank Bradshaw (31 May 1884 – mid-1962) was an English professional footballer and football club manager. A versatile player, he started his professional career as a forward with Sheffield Wednesday where he won the FA Cup in 1907. He later starred for Everton and Arsenal, moving to the full back position the later years of his career. He played once for the England national team and also represented the Southern League and the Football League, the latter on four occasions.

Early life
Frank Bradshaw was born on 31 May 1884 in Sheffield, Yorkshire.

Playing career
An intelligent inside-left, Bradshaw played for Oxford Street Sunday School and Sheffield Schools before joining Sheffield Wednesday as an amateur in 1904, turning professional the same year. In 1907, he played in Wednesday's FA Cup winning side thanks to an injury to regular inside-left Harry Davis. In June 1908 he played his only game for England, scoring a hat-trick as England beat Austria 11–1 in Vienna. Although he was once again selected to play Ireland the following February, he was forced to withdraw from the England squad due to injury, and was never selected again. He thus became the fifth and last (to date) player to score three goals on his solitary England appearance.

Bradshaw moved to Northampton Town in the summer of 1910 for a fee of £250, having played 87 league games and scored 37 goals for Wednesday. In November 1911 he returned to the Football League with Everton, where he scored 19 goals in 66 league games. In 1914 he moved to Arsenal, making his Arsenal debut in a Second Division match against Glossop North End on 1 September 1914, though after a season World War I intervened. Bradshaw continued to play for Arsenal, starring in over 125 unofficial wartime matches.

In December 1918, he was reported as one of around 60 well-known players and trainers who participated in the creation of a new Professional Football Players' and Trainer's Union.

By the time league football resumed in 1919 (and with Arsenal promoted to the First Division), Bradshaw had moved from inside-forward to full-back. He was a regular for Arsenal over the next four seasons, before retiring in May 1923. In addition to his wartime appearances, he played 142 league and cup games for Arsenal, scoring 14 goals.

A versatile player, he started his career as a forward before moving to the defender position later in his career, where he excelled. He was described in the Daily Herald as follows:

In the Sheffield Star Green 'Un in 1917, he was mentioned as the best full-back in England.

Managerial career
The same month he retired from playing, Bradshaw took over as manager of Aberdare Athletic. He left the club in April 1924 after guiding them to mid-table safety in the Third Division South.

He was later the manager of Taunton Town.

Career statistics

Club

International

England score listed first, score column indicates score after each Bradshaw goal

Honours
Sheffield Wednesday
FA Cup: 1906–07

References

External links
Profile at Arsenal F.C.

1884 births
1962 deaths
Footballers from Sheffield
English footballers
Association football forwards
Sheffield Wednesday F.C. players
Northampton Town F.C. players
Everton F.C. players
Arsenal F.C. players
English Football League players
FA Cup Final players
England international footballers
English Football League representative players
English football managers
Aberdare Athletic F.C. managers
Taunton Town F.C. managers
English Football League managers